Lloyd "Mooseman" Roberts III (December 24, 1962 – February 22, 2001) was an American musician, best known as a bassist for the rap metal band Body Count. Roberts was a key writer in the early years of Body Count. 

He also played with Iggy Pop, and recorded the studio album Beat 'Em Up as a member of the Trolls. Lloyd Roberts III also played with Onojee and Bhava Hari. He received awards in association with the bands he played with, such as gold records with Ice-T (Body Count) and the Hawaii Music Awards for Best World Music with Bhava Hari.
 
Roberts was born in Bernice, Louisiana. He attended Crenshaw High School in South Central Los Angeles, where he played in his high school band, met, and became close friends with Ice-T and D-Roc (Dennis Miles), with whom he would eventually form Body Count.

Roberts recorded the album Beat 'Em Up with Iggy Pop before being killed in a drive-by shooting in February 2001, in which he was not the intended target. He was 38 years old.

References

1962 births
2001 deaths
People from Bernice, Louisiana
Deaths by firearm in California
Body Count (band) members
American heavy metal bass guitarists
American male bass guitarists
American murder victims
People murdered in California
20th-century American musicians
American male guitarists
2001 murders in the United States
20th-century American guitarists
20th-century bass guitarists
20th-century American male musicians